The following article presents a summary of the 1994 football (soccer) season in Brazil, which was the 93rd season of competitive football in the country.

Campeonato Brasileiro Série A

Quarterfinals

|}

Semifinals

|}

Final

Palmeiras declared as the Campeonato Brasileiro champions by aggregate score of 4–2.

Relegation
The two worst placed teams in the repechage, which are Remo and Náutico, were relegated to the following year's second level.

Campeonato Brasileiro Série B

Semifinals

|}

Final

Goiás declared as the Campeonato Brasileiro Série B champions by aggregate score of 3-3.

Promotion
The champion and runner-up, which are Goiás and Juventude, were promoted to the following year's first level.

Relegation
The two worst placed teams in all the four groups in the first stage, which are Fortaleza and Tiradentes-DF, were relegated to the following year's third level.

Campeonato Brasileiro Série C

Quarterfinals

|}

Semifinals

|}

Final

Novorizontino declared as the Campeonato Brasileiro Série C champions by aggregate score of 6–0.

Promotion
The champion and the runner-up, which are Novorizontino and Ferroviária, were promoted to the following year's second level.

Copa do Brasil

The Copa do Brasil final was played between Grêmio and Ceará.

Grêmio declared as the cup champions by aggregate score of 1–0.

State championship champions

Youth competition champions

Other competition champions

Brazilian clubs in international competitions

Brazil national team
The following table lists all the games played by the Brazil national football team in official competitions and friendly matches during 1994.

Women's football

National team
The Brazil women's national football team did not play any matches in 1994.

Domestic competition champions

References

 Brazilian competitions at RSSSF
 1994 Brazil national team matches at RSSSF
 1986-1996 Brazil women's national team matches at RSSSF

 
Seasons in Brazilian football
Brazil